Karl-Heinz Becker may refer to:

 Karl-Heinz Becker (athlete) (1912–2001), German Olympic athlete

See also
Heinz Becker (disambiguation)